Bir Sorbottam (Bengali: বীর সর্বোত্তম) is the highest peacetime gallantry award of Bangladesh.

References 

Military awards and decorations of Bangladesh